Charles R. Bowers (June 6, 1887 – November 26, 1946)  was an American cartoonist and slapstick comedian during the silent film and early "talkie" era. He was forgotten for decades and his name was notably absent from most histories of the Silent Era, although his work was enthusiastically reviewed by André Breton and a number of his contemporaries. As his surviving films have an inventiveness and surrealism which give them a freshness appealing to modern audiences, after his rediscovery his work has sometimes been placed in the "top tier" of silent film accomplishments (along with those of, for example, Charlie Chaplin, Buster Keaton, Harold Lloyd). In comic style, he probably modelled himself after both Harry Langdon and Buster Keaton and was known to the French as "Bricolo."

Biography
The son of Dr. Charles E. Bowers and his wife, Mary I. Bowers, Charles Raymond Bowers was born in Cresco, Iowa. His early career was as a cartoonist on the Mutt and Jeff series of cartoons for the Barré Studio. By the late 20s, he was starring in his own series of slapstick comedies for R-C Pictures and Educational Pictures. His slapstick comedies, a few of which have survived, are an amazing mixture of live action and animation created with the "Bowers Process". Complex Rube Goldberg gadgets also appear in many of his comedies. Two notable films include Now You Tell One with a memorable scene of elephants marching into the U.S. Capitol, and There It Is, a surreal mystery involving the Fuzz-Faced Phantom and MacGregor, a housefly detective. He made a few sound films such as It's a Bird and Wild Oysters, and wrote and illustrated children's books in his later years. For eight years during the 1930s he lived in Wayne, New Jersey, and drew cartoons for the Jersey Journal. After he succumbed to severe arthritis his wife started drawing them under his direction.

Following a long illness, Bowers died in 1946 in Paterson, New Jersey, and was interred in that city's Cedar Lawn Cemetery.

Filmography

His work, long forgotten, has undergone a rediscovery and revival of interest in recent years. His 15 surviving films were the subject of a 2004 two-DVD release by Image Entertainment and Lobster Films of France. Much more of his work is thought to exist in various film archives. In July 2019, Flicker Alley released a Blu-ray set of 17 of his films called "The Extraordinary World of Charley Bowers."
The Extra Quick Lunch 1917, 5’34, Animation - Mutt and Jeff
A.W.O.L. 1918, 5’22, Animation
Egged On 1926, 24’08, Slapstick
He Done His Best 1926, 23’42, Slapstick
A Wild Roomer 1926, 24’27, Slapstick
Fatal Footstep 1926, 22’18, Slapstick
Now You Tell One 1926, 22’18, Slapstick
Many A Slip 1927, 11’36 (Incomplete), Slapstick
Nothing Doing 1927, 21’17, Slapstick
There It Is 1928, 17’22, Slapstick
Say Ah-h! 1928, 14’02 (Incomplete), Slapstick
It's A Bird 1930, 14’10, Slapstick
Believe It Or Don’t Ca 1935, 7’53, stop-motion Animation
Pete Roleum And His Cousins 1939, 15’41, stop-motion Animation
Wild Oysters 1940, 10’06, stop-motion Animation - Released by Paramount Pictures as a Max Fleischer Animated Antic
A Sleepless Night Ca 1940, 10’59, stop-motion Animation

Note: Bowers had stint with Walter Lantz in 1930s. Pre-1926 he was the one of the main directors of Mutt and Jeff animated shorts.

References

Bibliography
 Banc-Titre (March 1978). pp. 10–11. Article on Bowers' films, with short biography. (in French)
 Funnyworld (October 1978). pp. 35–36. Memories of Bowers, by animator Dick Huemer.
 Midi-Minuit Fantastique (June 1967). pp. 62–65, Article on Bowers' films and career. (in French)

External links

Mark Bourne's review of Charley Bowers: The Rediscovery of an American Comic Genius at The DVD Journal
Charles Bowers at Virtual History

Animators from Iowa
Animators from New Jersey
American cartoonists
People from Cresco, Iowa
People from Wayne, New Jersey
Silent film comedians
Stop motion animators
Burials at Cedar Lawn Cemetery
1880s births
1946 deaths
20th-century American comedians
American male comedy actors